Kasabian is the debut studio album by British rock band Kasabian, released on 6 September 2004. The album's highest chart position on the UK Albums Chart was number 4, making it the band's only studio album not to reach number one. Four singles were released from the album.

Different geographical regions had different colours for their album cover. The British version is black and white, the European import is black and red, and the American version is black and blue. The Japanese "Ultimate Version" is silver and white. The UK limited edition version is a double-sided DualDisc and has a glow-in-the-dark cover. The DVD element contains a making-of documentary and several music videos.

This album has been released with the Copy Control protection system in some regions. In the United States and Canada it uses the MediaMax CD-3 system.

The Canadian version of the album does not contain the songs "Orange", "Pinch Roller" and "Ovary Stripe", with the exception of digital releases.

This is the only full album to feature the lead guitarist and lead songwriter Christopher Karloff, who left the band during the recording sessions of their next album, Empire.

Critical reception

Kasabian received generally favourable reviews but music critics were mixed on the band's mixture of alternative rock and electronica. At Metacritic, which assigns a normalised rating out of 100 to reviews from mainstream critics, the album received an average score of 65, based on 21 reviews.

AllMusic's David Jeffries praised the album for its take on different rock genres and compared them favourably to The Stone Roses and Tangerine Dream, saying that "Painting them as rock's saviors just makes the overly ambitious moments of the album look all that much bigger." Paul Moody of NME praised the album for its aggressive instrumentals and space rock sound resembling that of The Libertines. He singled out "Test Transmission" as the standout track, calling it "an indication that once they've purged the violent tendencies, a future as space-rockers in the Spiritualized mould awaits." Betty Clarke of The Guardian praised the album's overall sound for resembling baggy music, saying that it "sums up Kasabian's affection for experimentation of every description."

Johnny Loftus, writing for Pitchfork, commended the album's high-energy tracks for containing production that will grab listeners' attention but felt that it loses steam in places and will send said listeners away to better records that inspired it, concluding that "Kasabian is brash, loutish, and seems liable at times to cut you; the consistent kick drum beat throughout it is like a great party's heartbeat. But like the roustabout in the corner, drinking all the lager and scratching up your old records, it can be more loudmouthed than substantial." Tom Edwards of Drowned in Sound criticized the album's songs for lacking any hooks and nuances to grab the listener's attention concluding with, "Sure this album may well sound awesome if you've just snorted a metre of charlie or recently breakfasted from a menu of 'shrooms and LSD, but for sober ears it's enough to drive anyone to drugs." Barry Walters of Rolling Stone criticized the band for filling the album with half-baked ideas based on influences from Happy Mondays and Primal Scream, saying that "Kasabian make the mistake of trying to be revolutionary by quoting revolutionaries."

Track listing

Personnel
Adapted from the Kasabian liner notes.
Tom Meighan – lead vocals , backing vocals 
Sergio Pizzorno – rhythm guitar , synths , lead vocals , vocals , backing vocals 
Christopher Karloff – lead guitar , synths , omnichord , bass 
Chris Edwards – bass 
Ian Matthews – drums 
Ryan Glover – drums 
Daniel Ralph Martin – drums 
Mitch Glover – drums 
Production

 Kasabian – production
 Jim Abbiss – additional production and mixing 
 Barny – mixing and engineering , mix engineer 
 Damian Taylor – programming 
 John Dent – mastering
 Simon Corkin – design, illustration
 Jill Furmanovsky – band photography

Charts and certifications

Weekly charts

Year-end charts

Certifications

References

External links
Official site

2004 debut albums
Albums produced by Jim Abbiss
Kasabian albums
RCA Records albums